Ranvika is a cove on the east coast of Peter I Island, in the Bellingshausen Sea off the coast of the Antarctic.

The island was discovered in 1927 by a Norwegian expedition on the  commanded by  Eyvind Tofte. The bay may be named after Ranvik, a bay in Norway, the site of the estate of Lars Christensen, sponsor of the expedition.

References

Coves of Antarctica
Bodies of water of Ellsworth Land
Peter I Island